Karthik Sivakumar (born 25 May 1977), is an Indian actor who works predominantly in Tamil cinema. He has won three Filmfare Awards South, an Edison Award, a SIIMA Award and a Tamil Nadu State Film Award.

The younger brother of actor Suriya and son of actor Sivakumar, Karthi initially joined Mani Ratnam as an assistant director and made his acting debut with Paruthiveeran (2007), which earned him several accolades including the Filmfare Award for Best Actor. He went on to star in notable films like Aayirathil Oruvan (2010), Paiyaa (2010), Naan Mahaan Alla (2010), Siruthai (2011), Biriyani (2013), Madras (2014), Thozha (2016), Theeran Adhigaaram Ondru (2017), Kadaikutty Singam (2018), Kaithi (2019), Thambi (2019), Sulthan (2021), Viruman (2022), Ponniyin Selvan: I (2022) and Sardar (2022), thus establishing himself as a commercially successful leading actor of Tamil cinema. 

Apart from his film career, Karthi has also been involved in social welfare activities, encouraging fans to do likewise through the "Makkal Nala Mandram", a social welfare club that he inaugurated. In 2011, he became a cause ambassador to promote awareness of lysosomal storage diseases. As of 2015, he is the treasurer of the Nadigar Sangam.

Early life and family 
Karthi was born Karthik Sivakumar on 25 May 1977 in Madras (now Chennai), Tamil Nadu, India. He completed his elementary and secondary school education at Padma Seshadri Bala Bhavan and St. Bede's Anglo Indian Higher Secondary School, Chennai. He gained a bachelor's degree in mechanical engineering from Crescent Engineering College, Chennai. After graduation, he worked as an Engineering consultant in Chennai and considered higher studies abroad. "I was earning about  5000 per month and found the work monotonous. That was when I thought, I should do something more", he recalled in an interview. Karthi got a scholarship for his higher studies in the United States, and enrolled at Binghamton University, New York, where he earned his Master of Science in industrial engineering. While pursuing his master's degree, he also took elective courses on filmmaking.

During his stay in New York, Karthi worked as a part-time graphic designer. He then decided to pursue a career in filmmaking; he attended two courses in basic filmmaking at State University of New York. He stated: "I always knew I wanted to be in films, but I did not know exactly what I wanted to do. I loved movies and watched a lot of them. But my father insisted that I get a good education before I joined the film industry".

Acting career

2004–2007: Debut success 
When Karthi returned to Chennai, he met director Mani Ratnam and got a chance to work as an assistant director in Aayutha Ezhuthu, because he wanted to become a film director and preferred directing to acting, though he did appear as an extra in Aayutha Ezhuthu. He continued to receive acting offers and his father convinced him to take up acting, telling him " ... one can always direct films, but one will not get a chance to act once you grow older". He accepted his first acting assignment with Priyamani as female lead in April 2005. When director Ameer approached him to play the titular character in the film Paruthiveeran, he accepted the offer because the film was " ... so compelling". The filming started in July 2005 and experienced financial difficulties, and was almost abandoned by mid–2006. It was released in January 2007, to critical acclaim and became commercially successful.

Critics unanimously praised Karthi's portrayal of a careless village ruffian. Behindwoods said: "He has done away with every trace of sophistication in his body language and even handles the sickle with consummate ease. He looks every inch a hot blooded youngster from some rural part of Tamil Nadu [and] appears seasoned in the romantic scenes ... Uninformed people might not believe that this is the young man's big screen debut. Look out for this guy ... ". Sify said: "It's hard to believe that it is Karthi's debut film as he is just spectacular. His expressions, anger, laughter and anguish are all so realistic that you can feel the fire in him." Rediff called his performance "excellent", and " ... one of the top performances of 2007". Karthi received several accolades for his performance, including the Filmfare Award for Best Actor in Tamil.

2008–2011: Break after Paruthiveeran 
In October 2006, Karthi signed his second project under Selvaraghavan's direction, Idhu Maalai Nerathu Mayakkam, which was supposed to be a romance film, featuring Sandhya as the female lead. Karthi's character was a " ... sophisticated upmarket stylish guy ... ". Selvaraghavan abandoned that project and in July 2007, he announced the production of an action-adventure film titled Aayirathil Oruvan, with Karthi in the lead role. Filming began later that year and was expected to be completed by February 2008. The producers planned to release it in mid-2008, but production was delayed and filming continued until early 2009. He had agreed to play the lead character in Linguswamy's next film Paiyaa, in September 2007. Because of the slow progress of Aayirathil Oruvan, Paiyaa was postponed several times. He later said that he became anxious because he received several film offers, but could not work on them because he needed to maintain the continuity of his looks. During the filming of Aayirathil Oruvan, producer R.Ravindran complained that Karthi was trying to change his look and move on to Paiyaa before finishing his commitments.

Aayirathil Oruvan was released in early 2010. Karthi's portrayal of a chief coolie was often compared to that in his debut film. Sify called Karthi's performance " ... a scream.", and said, "Right from his introduction scene till the end, he is lovable and provides humour.", and that he had " ... made a sensational comeback ... ".

In April 2010, Linguswamy's Paiyaa released. A romantic road-trip film, featuring an album by Yuvan Shankar Raja, it was very successful. For the first time, he enacted a character that lives in an urban area. He said that he accepted the film because he desperately wanted to play a cool dude on screen. Karthi's performances in Aayirathil Oruvan and Paiyaa earned him further nominations at the 58th Filmfare Awards South in the Best Actor category. Both films were dubbed into Telugu as Yuganiki Okkadu and Aawara, respectively, and were successful.

Karthi's third film in 2010 was Suseenthiran's action thriller Naan Mahaan Alla, in which he played a middle class youth from Chennai whose life is disrupted when his father is targeted by a gang of killers. It received good reviews, was very popular, and Karthi's performances was praised by critics. Sreedhar Pillai wrote for Sify: "[Karthi] nails the character to perfection"  ...  He is one good reason to see the film." Bhama Devi Ravi of Times of India wrote: "  ...  what a pleasure to see Karthi deliver his best performance to date  ...  ". Rediff wrote that "Karthi has simply had a ball ... " and "It's been a long time since you saw an actor who can be as convincing in sadness and rage, as in happiness." Naan Mahaan Alla was dubbed into Telugu and released as Naa Peru Shiva in 2011; it was very successful and earned Karthi some Telugu film offers.

Karthi's next film was the action–masala Siruthai (2011), a remake of the 2006 Telugu film Vikramarkudu. He played two roles; a thief and a police officer. Karthi's performances received favourable reviews. Malathi Rangarajan of The Hindu wrote: "Karthi looks and performs better with every film. Siruthai exemplifies the observation". Pavithra Srinivasan of Rediff wrote: "But the film belongs to Rocket Raja (Karthi), the sort of adorable ruffian Tamil cinema has been missing for a while. He picks pockets, slices off handbags, charms women and even bashes (!) them up without a single jolt to his conscience." Despite gaining mixed critical response, the film achieved financial success, becoming one of the highest-grossing Tamil films of 2011. In 2011, Siruthai became Karthi's biggest commercial success, cementing his position in the Tamil film industry. Sify said that Karthi had become " ... one of the hottest stars in Kollywood". He made a special appearance in a song in K. V. Anand's Ko (2011), alongside other prominent actors from Tamil cinema.

2012–present: Career slump and resurgence 
In May 2011, Karthi began working in the political comedy film Saguni, directed by Shankar Dayal and featuring him amongst an ensemble cast of supporting actors. He played Kamalakannan in the film, a villager who comes to the city to save his palatial house in Karaikudi from being destroyed for a politician's personal gain and unknowingly transforms to become a kingmaker in Tamil Nadu politics. The film opened to mixed reviews from critics, and became a box office failure. Karthi dubbed for himself for the Telugu version of Saguni (2012) and his since dubbed for the Telugu dubbed versions of all of his films. He later appeared in the 2013 Pongal release Alex Pandian, opposite Anushka Shetty, which also opened to negative critical response upon release.

Karthi's next release was Rajesh M's All in All Azhagu Raja, which featured him opposite Kajal Aggarwal and Santhanam. The film was released on Diwali 2013, and received mostly negative reviews from critics, with Behindwoods saying: "Though the laughs are spread across a few moments, when All in All Azhagu Raja is pitted against Rajesh's other wholesome "laughathons" such as Oru Kal Oru Kannadi and Boss Engira Bhaskaran, it falls way short" and Sify saying "The trouble with All in All Azhagu Raja is that it lacks basic story line and took the audiences for granted. The film has no real script to speak of, at best a skeletal plot." His next film was Venkat Prabhu's Biriyani, which was released in December 2013, opening to positive reviews and became a box office success. He also sang the song "Mississippi" under Yuvan Shankar Raja's direction. In 2014, Karthi appeared in Pa. Ranjith's Madras, a critical and commercial success. His next release was the 2015 action drama Komban. His first release in 2016 was the Telugu-Tamil bilingual film Oopiri / Thozha. The film received positive reviews. Karthi's performance was also praised, with Baradwaj Rangan of The Hindu stating (in his review of the Tamil version Thozha), "At a time every leading man (including Karthi) seems to be participating in a game-show titled Who Wants To Be The Next Rajinikanth?, here's a simple 'buddy movie' (in the Hollywoodian sense), with no punch dialogues, no action sequences, with just one duet (with Tamannaah, who plays Vikram's secretary; her romance with Seenu is strangely unresolved). We see, all the time, character actors striving to become larger-than-life heroes. For a change, here's a hero scaling himself down to play a life-sized character." Later that year, Karthi appeared in director Gokul's Kaashmora. Though the film received mixed reviews, his performance was praised.

Karthi's Kaatru Veliyidai, was directed and produced by Mani Ratnam. The film met with mixed reviews and became a failure. Karthi's Theeran Adhigaaram Ondru was directed by H. Vinoth and produced by Dream Warrior Pictures. It received critical acclaim and Karthi received a Filmfare Award South for the Best Actor – Critics for his performance. The film became a huge success at the box office. Right after Theeran Karthi acted in Kadaikutty Singam portrayed the role of a farmer directed by Pandiraj which has been produced by this brother Suriya which has gained the highest footfalls in the year 2018 in Tamil Nadu. His next film was Dev, produced by Prince Pictures, directed by debutante director Rajath Ravishankar, music composed by Harris Jayaraj and R.Velraj handles the camera. The film received negative reviews from critics and eventually became a commercial failure.

His Deepawali release in the same year Kaithi was a blockbuster hit and it collected more than one billion in box office. Kaithi became the highest grosser in his career. He was next seen in Sulthan, directed by Bakkiyaraj Kannan. The movie also stars Rashmika Mandanna in a lead role. The film met with positive review and became box-office success.

Next he was seen in rural based film, Viruman directed by M. Muthaiah, marking his second collaboration with the director. Viruman turned out to became commercial successful. After Viruman, Karthi was seen in Magnum Opus Ponniyin Selvan directed by Mani Ratnam. Karthi will be playing as Vallavaraiyan Vandiyadevan in that film and this is the first Pan-Indian film for the actor. The actor was also next seen in a dual role as father and son in Sardar release on Diwali 2022.

Personal life 
Karthi is the second son of actor Sivakumar and his wife Lakshmi. He has two siblings; an elder brother, Suriya, who was already an established actor at the time of Karthi's film debut, and a younger sister, Brindha, who is a singer in Tamil cinema. Tamil film actress Jyothika is Karthi's sister-in-law. On 3 July 2011, Karthi married Ranjani Chinnasamy, who graduated with a master's degree in English literature from Stella Maris College, Chennai. They were engaged on 29 April 2011 at Ranjani's native village, Goundampalayam in Erode district, and the wedding was held in a traditional Kongu culture at the CODISSIA Trade Fair Complex in Coimbatore. The wedding was arranged by the elders of the family. They have two children, a daughter and a son.

Other work 
Karthi has been involved in several charities and social service activities. On his 31st birthday, he inaugurated the Makkal Nala Mandram, in order to encourage his fans to become involved in welfare activities. During the event, Karthi donated blood, donated bicycles to handicapped people, sewing machines to women and schoolbags to children. He presented a cheque of  50,000 to YRG Care Centre, which helps AIDS affected children. In 2011, Karthi became a cause ambassador for promoting awareness of lysosomal storage disease. He had also adopted a white tiger cub at Vandalur Zoo and contributed  72,000 to protect and preserve the animal. On his birthdays, Karthi visits orphanages and donates funds to them. He told Indiaglitz; "When I see people in need, I make sure I go and help. If I am going on birthdays to reach out to kids in orphanages, it is for my own satisfaction. I feel happier to be with them and it's nice to make them smile on that particular day."

In September 2010, Karthi signed a contract with Bharti Airtel to become its brand ambassador in South India and appear in its "Indraikku enna plan" advertising campaign. He has also appeared in advertisements for Bru Instant Coffee along with Kajal Aggarwal, who had earlier acted opposite him in Naan Mahaan Alla and All in All Azhagu Raja.

In 2015, Karthi joined fellow actors Vishal, Nassar, Karunas and Ponvannan to campaign against the concurrent office bearers of the Nadigar Sangam, led by R. Sarathkumar and Radha Ravi. He was successful in the election, becoming the association's treasurer. After starring in Kaatru Veliyidai, he expressed his interest in learning to fly.

Filmography

Films 
All films are Tamil unless otherwise noted.

Discography

Notes

References

External links 

 
 

Indian male film actors
Tamil male actors
Living people
1977 births
Male actors from Chennai
Filmfare Awards South winners
Tamil Nadu State Film Awards winners
Padma Seshadri Bala Bhavan schools alumni
Binghamton University alumni